Jacob Ziv (born 1931) is an Israeli electrical engineer who, along with Abraham Lempel, developed the LZ family of lossless data compression algorithms.

Biography
Ziv was born in Tiberias, British mandate Palestine, on 27 November 1931. He received the B.Sc., Dip. Eng., and M.Sc. degrees, all in electrical engineering, from the Technion – Israel Institute of Technology in 1954, and 1957, respectively, and the D.Sc. degree from the Massachusetts Institute of Technology in 1962.

Ziv joined the Technion – Israel Institute of Technology in 1970 and is Herman Gross Professor of Electrical Engineering and a Technion Distinguished Professor. His research interests include data compression, information theory, and statistical communication theory.

Ziv was Dean of the Faculty of Electrical Engineering from 1974 to 1976 and Vice President for Academic Affairs from 1978 to 1982. Since 1987 Ziv has spent three sabbatical leaves at the Information Research Department of Bell Laboratories in Murray Hill, New Jersey, USA.

From 1955 to 1959, he was a Senior Research Engineer in the Scientific Department Israel Ministry of Defense, and was assigned to the research and development of communication systems. From 1961 to 1962, while studying for his doctorate at M.I.T., he joined the Applied Science Division of Melpar, Inc., Watertown, MA, where he was a Senior Research Engineer doing research in communication theory. In 1962 he returned to the Scientific Department, Israel Ministry of Defense, as Head of the Communications Division and was also an Adjunct of the Faculty of Electrical Engineering, Technion - Israel Institute of Technology. From 1968 to 1970 he was a Member of the Technical Staff of Bell Laboratories, Inc. Ziv was the Chairman of the Israeli Universities Planning and Grants Committee from 1985 to 1991 (The Planning and Grant Committee is the interface between the Government of Israel and the Universities; it prepares the budget, presents it to the government, and allocates it to the Universities; it is in charge of development and means and practices in the Universities). He has been a member of the Israel Academy of Sciences and Humanities since 1981 and served as its president between 1995 and 2004.

Awards
In 1993, Ziv was awarded the Israel Prize, for exact sciences.

Ziv received in 1995 the IEEE Richard W. Hamming Medal, for "contributions to information theory, and the theory and practice of data compression", and in 1998 a Golden Jubilee Award for Technological Innovation from the IEEE Information Theory Society.

Ziv is the recipient of the 1997 Claude E. Shannon Award from the IEEE Information Theory Society and the 2008 BBVA Foundation Frontiers of Knowledge Award in the category of Information and Communication Technologies.

For 2021, Ziv has been awarded the IEEE Medal of Honor, the highest recognition from IEEE, "for fundamental contributions to information theory and data compression technology, and for distinguished research leadership".

Ziv was elected to the American Philosophical Society in 2003 and the National Academy of Sciences in 2004.

See also 
List of Israel Prize recipients

Lectures 

 1992 -  Information measures of individual sequences with application to universal data compression and hypothesis testing Lecture sponsored by the Dept. of Electrical and Computer engineering, University of California, San Diego. Electrical and Computer Engineering Distinguished Lecture Series. Digital Object Made Available by Special Collections & Archives, UC San Diego.

References

External links
 A Conversation with Jacob Ziv (on his 65th birthday)
 ACM Paris Kanellakis Theory and Practice Award 1977: Jacob Ziv
 

1931 births
Living people
Israeli Jews
Israeli computer scientists
Israeli information theorists
Foreign associates of the National Academy of Engineering
Foreign associates of the National Academy of Sciences
Israel Prize in exact science recipients
Israel Prize in exact science recipients who were computer scientists
Academic staff of Technion – Israel Institute of Technology
Members of the Israel Academy of Sciences and Humanities
Jewish scientists
People from Tiberias
Technion – Israel Institute of Technology alumni
Presidents of the Israel Academy of Sciences and Humanities
Jews in Mandatory Palestine
Members of the European Academy of Sciences and Arts
IEEE Medal of Honor recipients
Members of the American Philosophical Society
Israel Defense Prize recipients